The 1974–75 United Counties League season was the 68th in the history of the United Counties League, a football competition in England.

Premier Division

The Premier Division featured 17 clubs which competed in the division last season, along with two new clubs, joined from the Spartan League:
Leighton Town
Vauxhall Motors

League table

Division One

The Division One featured 16 clubs which competed in the division last season, along with 2 new clubs, promoted from Division Two: 
Woodford United
Irchester United

League table

Division Two

The Division Two featured 16 clubs which competed in the division last season, along with 4 new clubs:
British Timken Duston, relegated from Division One 
Buckingham Town, transferred from the South Midlands League
Vauxhall Motors reserves
Potton United reserves

League table

References

External links
 United Counties League

1974–75 in English football leagues
United Counties League seasons